César Emanuel Pereyra (born November 23, 1981), nicknamed "El Picante", is an Argentine footballer who currently plays for Rocha in the Uruguayan Segunda División.

Teams
 Unión de Santa Fe 2002-2005
 Independiente 2005-2006
 Atlas 2006
 Unión de Santa Fe 2007–2009
 Belgrano de Córdoba 2009-
 Sporting Cristal 2015-2016
 Blooming 2017-

External links
 
 

1981 births
Living people
Argentine footballers
Argentine expatriate footballers
Club Atlético Independiente footballers
Club Atlético Belgrano footballers
Unión de Santa Fe footballers
Atlas F.C. footballers
Sporting Cristal footballers
Club Blooming players
Deportivo Maldonado players
Rocha F.C. players
Argentine Primera División players
Primera Nacional players
Liga MX players
Peruvian Primera División players
Bolivian Primera División players
Uruguayan Segunda División players
Expatriate footballers in Mexico
Expatriate footballers in Bolivia
Association football forwards
Sportspeople from Santa Fe Province